Paul Stephen Kropp (February 22, 1948 – August 22, 2015) was an American-born Canadian author, publisher and educator.

He was born in Buffalo, New York and grew up there. Kropp studied at Columbia University, receiving a BA. In 1970, he came to Canada and completed an MA at the University of Western Ontario. He began teaching at a vocational school in Hamilton; his first book Burn Out (1977) was aimed at reluctant readers.

His books have been translated into German, Danish, French, Portuguese and Spanish and have won awards in Canada and internationally.

He established a publishing company, High Interest Publishing, in 2002 with Terry Durkin. He also served as president of the Canadian Society of Children's Authors, Illustrators, & Performers.

Kropp married Lori Jamison.

He died from cancer at the age of 67.

Selected work 
 Jo's Search (1986), illustrated by Heather Collins
 Cottage Crazy (1988)
 Moonkid and Liberty (1988)
 Fast Times with Fred (1990)
 Ski Stooges (1992)
 Ellen/Elena/Luna (1992), nominated for a Toronto Book Award
 How to Make Your Child a Reader for Life (1993)
 Moonkid and Prometheus (1997)
 The Lost Botticelli (2014)

References 

1948 births
2015 deaths
Canadian children's writers
Canadian schoolteachers
Canadian book publishers (people)
University of Western Ontario alumni
Columbia College (New York) alumni